Johannes Lochner (born 15 October 1990) is a German bobsledder who competed at the 2018 Winter Olympics and the 2022 Winter Olympics in Beijing where he won two silver medals.

Bobsleigh results
All results are sourced from the International Bobsleigh and Skeleton Federation (IBSF).

Olympic Games

World Championships

World cup

References

External links

Johannes Lochner at the German Bobsleigh, Luge, and Skeleton Federation 

German male bobsledders
Bobsledders at the 2018 Winter Olympics
Bobsledders at the 2022 Winter Olympics
Olympic bobsledders of Germany
Medalists at the 2022 Winter Olympics
Olympic medalists in bobsleigh
Olympic silver medalists for Germany
1990 births
Living people
People from Berchtesgaden
Sportspeople from Upper Bavaria
21st-century German people